Fateful Findings is a 2012 American independent science fiction film directed, written, produced, edited by, and starring Neil Breen, who was also in charge of production design, set decoration, makeup, sound editing, catering, and casting. The film was screened on December 8, 2012, at the invite-only Butt-Numb-A-Thon, had a public festival debut on May 23, 2013, at the Seattle International Film Festival, and was released to theaters in early 2014.

Upon release, it was declared one of the "worst films ever made" and quickly gained a cult following.

Among other things, viewers cite the film's cryptic and incomprehensible plot, poor production values, overt political messages, stilted dialogue, and bizarre and unnatural performances as well as Breen's real-life eccentricities as part of the film's ironic appeal. Some critics have cited the film as an example of outsider art, and the phenomenon of "so bad it's good" media.

Plot
Eight-year-olds Dylan and Leah discover a magical black stone in the woods. With Leah's family's departure imminent, the two vow to always be friends but never see each other again.

Decades later, Dylan, now a successful novelist, is struck by a car but miraculously survives the accident. In the hospital, he rapidly heals from his injuries, which he credits to the power of the stone. Returning home, Dylan reveals to his wife, Emily, that he has not been working on a new book but has instead been using his hacking abilities to uncover "the most secret government and corporate secrets", which he plans to publish in an exposé. His commitment to the project is tested by his wife's descent into drug addiction and eventual overdose, as well as the constant sexual attention paid to him by his best friend Jim's underage daughter. Later, Jim himself is murdered by his wife for valuing taking care of his car over listening to her issues. Distraught, she stages his death as a suicide. Later Dylan finds Jim's body and can't believe he committed suicide but is unable to help him.

Plagued by disturbing dreams of a mystical book, Dylan begins seeing a psychologist, who helps him unearth repressed childhood memories. Doing so causes Dylan to realize that the doctor who attended to him during his recovery from the car accident was an adult Leah and the two are reunited, quickly beginning a sexual relationship. Learning about Dylan's plans to publish the exposé, a mysterious assailant kidnaps Leah. Using psychic powers granted to him by the stone, Dylan rescues her by teleporting into the kidnapper's compound. He then travels to the desert to find the book he sees in his dream. Going to visit his psychologist one last time, Dylan learns that she is, in fact, a ghost.

Dylan publishes his book, hosting a press conference in front of the National Archives Building divulging "the most secret government and corporate secrets". Various congresspeople and corporate executives react to the speech by committing mass suicide to applause from the audience. A camouflaged sniper attempts to assassinate him only for Dylan to kill him by reflecting the bullet using his psychic powers. His mission complete, Dylan and Leah return to the place where they found the stone in the woods as children.

Cast
 Neil Breen as Dylan
 Jack Batoni as young Dylan
 Jennifer Autry as Leah
 Brianna Borden as young Leah
 Klara Landrat as Emily
 Danielle Andrade as Aly
 Victoria Viveiros as Amy
 David Silva as Jim

Release
After Breen generated buzz and a cult following with his previous films, Fateful Findings played at Harry Knowles' 2012 Butt-Numb-A-Thon, an invite-only film festival. In 2013, it played at the Seattle International Film Festival's Midnight Adrenaline program. The festival's programmer, Clinton McClung, said that he chose the film despite its amateurishness because of its uniqueness and cult appeal.  Panorama Entertainment subsequently distributed it in the U.S.

Reception
Alan Jones of The Dissolve wrote that the film could only have been made by Breen, as his incompetence makes what could have been boring instead fascinating. Peter K. of Twitch Film wrote, "It's not just for enjoying hilarious incompetence, more purely it is for the act of watching eccentric choices made by even more eccentric people."

Fateful Findings has become a cult film.  Describing why he thinks it deserves to be a cult film, Nathan Rabin called the film outsider art as unpredictable and unconventional as Citizen Kane.

Jason Howard of INLUX Magazine began his interview of Breen by praising the film, writing "Ever on the hunt for the next great 'cult classic', I recently stumbled upon Fateful Findings" and "it only took about a minute into the film for me to discover that I was watching something special that had more to offer than the typical film".

See also

 List of films considered the worst

References

External links
 
 
 

2012 science fiction films
2012 films
American independent films
American science fiction films
2010s English-language films
Films about computing
Films about conspiracy theories
Films about psychic powers
Paranormal films
Techno-thriller films
Films set in Washington, D.C.
2012 independent films
2010s American films
English-language science fiction films